Phytoecia balcanica is a species of beetle in the family Cerambycidae. It was described by Frivaldsky in 1835, originally under the genus Saperda. It is known from Turkey, Bulgaria and Crete. It feeds on Salvia sclarea.

Varietas
 Phytoecia balcanica var. subvitticollis Breuning, 1951
 Phytoecia balcanica var. candiana Plavilstshikov, 1930

References

Phytoecia
Beetles described in 1835